The 1949–50 Scottish Division B was won by Morton who, along with second placed Airdrieonians, were promoted to Division A. Alloa Athletic finished bottom.

Table

References

Scottish Football Archive

Scottish Division Two seasons
2
Scot